ProgID (short for PROGrammatic IDentifier) is a COM term, which is basically a string like "msxml2.domdocument" to represent an underlying CLSID which is something like {F9043C85-F6F2-101A-A3C9-08002B2F49FB}.

It is also used to express binary code compatibility between two COM objects.

See also
 ClsID

References

External links
 A Microsoft MSDN article about ProgIDs
 A VBAccelerator article about ProgIDs

Backward compatibility
Microsoft application programming interfaces
Object-oriented programming
Unique identifiers